The Michigan Ice was a pro softball team in Michigan.

The team was located in Midland, and plays its home games at Currie Stadium, located in Emerson Park, Michigan.

After playing partial seasons in the NPF for 2006 and 2007 with hopes of becoming an expansion team, the team folded in 2008, citing financial difficulties.

References

Softball teams
Defunct softball teams in the United States
Defunct National Pro Fastpitch teams
2008 disestablishments in Michigan
Sports clubs disestablished in 2008
Defunct sports teams in Michigan
Midland, Michigan
Women's sports in Michigan